Heron is a family of wading birds. 

Heron may also refer to:

Business
 Heron International, a United Kingdom-based property development company
 Heron Tower, a skyscraper in London
 Heron Foods, a frozen food retail chain in the United Kingdom
 Heron Plastics, a kit car manufacturer in the 1950s and 1960s
 Heron S.A., a Greek power company

People
 Heron or Hero of Alexandria (c. 10 – 70), ancient Greek mathematician and engineer, creator of Heron's formula (area of triangle) and Heron's method (square root)
 Saint Heron (107–127), third Bishop of Antioch
 Heron (martyr) (died 202), Egyptian martyr
 Heron Ricardo Ferreira (born 1958), a Brazilian professional football manager
 Heron (surname)
 Clan Heron, a Scottish border-riding clan
 Heron Baronets, two extinct baronetcies
 Heron (footballer), Heron Crespo da Silva, Brazilian footballer

Places
Heron, Montana
Héron, Belgium
Heron Island (disambiguation), various islands
Heron Lake (disambiguation), several lakes and a small city
Heron Park, Ottawa, Canada
Heron Road (Ottawa)
Heron (crater), an impact crater on the Moon
Martins Heron, Berkshire, England

Vehicles
HMS Heron, various ships and installations of the Royal Navy
USS Heron, three ships of the US Navy
Heron (dinghy)
Hawker Heron, a biplane fighter
de Havilland Heron, a four-engine aircraft
IAI Heron, an Unmanned Aerial Vehicle 
 Heron TP, an alternative name for the Eitan (UCAV) unmanned aircraft
 Heron, a Carmarthen and Cardigan Railway steam locomotive built in 1861
Heron Cars, a New Zealand car maker
Heron (automobile), a Formula Junior racing car

Other uses
 Heron (band), a 1970s English folk-rock band
 "Heron", a song by Avail from their 2000 album One Wrench
 Hardy Heron, the codename for the 8.04 LTS release of Ubuntu
 Heron Stakes, a thoroughbred race in Great Britain
 Heron's fountain, a hydraulic machine invented by physicist Heron aka "Hero of Alexandria"
 Heron's formula, gives the area of a triangle when the length of all three sides are known.
 Heronian triangle, a triangle with integer side-lengths and integer area.
 Heron's method, an early method of approximating square root.

See also
 Heroin,  an opiate typically used as a recreational drug